Hugh Joseph Tinney (born 14 May 1944, in Glasgow) is a Scottish former footballer.

Tinney played for Partick Thistle in Scotland before moving to England where he played for Bury. Tinney played six seasons at Bury before moving to Northern Premier League club Fleetwood in 1973. Tinney later moved to Australia to play for Balgownie Rangers.

Tinney made two appearances for the Scotland national team during a 1967 overseas tour that the Scottish Football Association decided in October 2021 to reclassify as full internationals.

References

1944 births
Living people
Scottish footballers
Partick Thistle F.C. players
Bury F.C. players
Fleetwood Town F.C. players
Bathgate Thistle F.C. players
Scotland under-23 international footballers
Scottish Football League players
English Football League players
Association football fullbacks
Scottish expatriate footballers
Expatriate soccer players in Australia
Footballers from Glasgow
Scotland international footballers